Susana Li Zhang (born 20 May 1996) is a Chilean karateka. She won the silver medal in the women's kumite -68 kg event at the 2019 Pan American Games held in Lima, Peru.

Achievements

References 

Living people
1996 births
Place of birth missing (living people)
Chilean female karateka
Competitors at the 2018 South American Games
South American Games silver medalists for Chile
South American Games medalists in karate
Pan American Games medalists in karate
Pan American Games silver medalists for Chile
Karateka at the 2019 Pan American Games
Medalists at the 2019 Pan American Games
21st-century Chilean women